The Richard W. and Margaret Mills House is located in Lodi, Wisconsin, United States. It was added to the National Register of Historic Places in 2009.

History
The house was originally built from 1895 to 1896 and belonged to Richard and Margaret Mills. In 1898 it was expanded.

Richard Mills' brother, Job, built the Job Mills Block, which is also listed on the National Register of Historic Places.

References

Houses in Columbia County, Wisconsin
Houses completed in 1896
Houses on the National Register of Historic Places in Wisconsin
Queen Anne architecture in Wisconsin
Lodi, Wisconsin
National Register of Historic Places in Columbia County, Wisconsin